Ramji Gulati is an Indian singer and music producer. He mostly contributes to Hindi and Punjabi language songs.

Career 

In 2020, Ramji Gulati released his song "Luck Di Kasam" starring Siddharth Nigam and Avneet Kaur which as of January 2023 has more than 80 million views.

His song, Tere Bin Kive featured Jannat Zubair Rahmani and Mr Faisu. On 15 February 2021, Gulati released his song 'Carrom Ki Rani' starring Tiktok stars Mr. Faisu and Jannat Zubair Rahmani.

Nominations and awards 
Gulati was nominated at the 2010 Global Indian Music Academy Awards as the Best Debutant singer, lyricist, composer. His music album UWF Vol.1 was nominated in the category, Most Popular Album.

Discography
 "Tere Bin Kive"
 "Ishq Farzi"
 "Nazar Na Lag Jaye"
 "Fruity Lagdi Hai"
''On My Way''
''Battiyan Bujhaado''
 "Luck Di Kasam"
 "Kaali Meri Gaddi"
''Nazar Na Lag Jaye''
''Rona Likha Tha''
''Marda Saara India''
''Marda Chhod Gaya''
''Rovaan Layi''
"Carrom Ki Rani"

References

External links 
 
 

Living people
Indian composers
Indian record producers
21st-century Indian male singers
21st-century Indian singers
Punjabi-language singers
Hindi-language singers
Year of birth missing (living people)